Auristomia erjaveciana is a species of sea snail, a marine gastropod mollusk in the family Pyramidellidae, the pyrams and their allies.

Description
The size of the shell varies between 1.9 mm and 3 mm. The shell is smooth. The aperture is large and auriculate.

Distribution
This species occurs in the following locations:
 European waters (ERMS scope) : Mediterranean Sea
 Greek Exclusive Economic Zone
 Portuguese Exclusive Economic Zone
 Spanish Exclusive Economic Zone

References

 van Aartsen J.J. & Menkhorst H.P.M.G. (1996) Nordsieck's Pyramidellidae (Gastropoda Prosobranchia): A revision of his types. Part 1: The genera Chrysallida, Ondina (s.n. Evalea) and Menestho. Basteria 60(1-3: 45-56. [23 August 1996
 Giannuzzi-Savelli R., Pusateri F., Micali, P., Nofroni, I., Bartolini S. (2014). Atlante delle conchiglie marine del Mediterraneo, vol. 5 (Heterobranchia). Edizioni Danaus, Palermo, pp. 1– 111 with 41 unnumbered plates (figs. 1-363), appendix pp. 1–91.
page(s): 54, appendix p. 13, 60

External links
 To Biodiversity Heritage Library (1 publication)
 To CLEMAM
 To Encyclopedia of Life
 To World Register of Marine Species

Pyramidellidae
Gastropods described in 1869